Benjamin Brackett Downing (born September 11, 1981) is an American politician and Democratic former member of the Massachusetts State Senate. He represented the Berkshire, Hampshire and Franklin district from 2007 to 2013, before being redistricted to the Berkshire, Hampshire, Franklin, and Hampden district, which he represented until 2017.

Life and career
The oldest of four children, Benjamin Downing was born in Pittsfield to Gerard, the late Berkshire County District Attorney, and Pamela Downing. He attended Providence College in Rhode Island, and graduated with a Bachelor of Arts degree in political science in 2003. He then moved to Washington, D.C., where he worked for U.S. Representatives Bill Delahunt and Richard Neal before joining the staff of John Olver. He served as Olver's senior advisor on housing, budget, tax, homeland security, and foreign affairs for two years.

He returned to Massachusetts in 2004 and began his graduate studies at Tufts University, where he went on to receive a Master of Arts degree in Urban & Environmental Policy. While a student at Tufts, he successfully ran for an open seat in the Massachusetts Senate in 2006. He won re-election unopposed in 2008, 2010, 2012, and 2014. During the tenure in the Senate, he served as chair, Joint Committee on Telecommunications, Utilities and Energy (2011-2014); chair, Senate Committee on Bills in Third Reading (2013-2014); chair, Senate Committee on Steering & Policy (2012); Acting Chair, Joint Committee on Higher Education (2010); chair, Joint Committee on Revenue (2009-2010); chair, Senate Committee on Ethics and Rules (2007-2008); chair, Joint Committee on Public Service (2007).

Keeping a promise he made at the start of his tenure in the Senate, Downing term-limited himself and announced in January 2016 that he would not seek a sixth term. Upon leaving public office, he joined leading renewable energy company Nexamp.

Ben has previously served as co-chair of the Leadership Council to End Chronic Homelessness in Berkshire County, co-chair, Massachusetts Democratic Party's Committee on Youth Services, Advisory Council of Multicultural BRIDGE, “Honorary Chairman, College Democrats of Massachusetts," Advisory Council of the Mahaiwe Performing Arts Center, Honorary Member of the Advisory Committee on Workforce Development for Homeless Families, Member of the Pittsfield Democratic Committee, and Member of the Massachusetts Democratic Party's Rural Subcommittee.

In February 2021, he announced his campaign for Governor of Massachusetts in the 2022 election, becoming the first candidate to enter the race. On December 28, 2021, Downing announced he was ending his campaign bid for Governor of Massachusetts.

Electoral history

References

External links 

 Official policy and constituent services website
Massachusetts General Court - State Senator Benjamin B. Downing official MA House website
Campaign website
Project Vote Smart - Representative Benjamin Brackett Downing (MA) profile
Follow the Money - Benjamin Brackett Downing
2006 campaign contributions

1981 births
Living people
Democratic Party Massachusetts state senators
People from Great Barrington, Massachusetts
Politicians from Pittsfield, Massachusetts
Tufts University alumni
Providence College alumni
21st-century American politicians